Hemorrhage is a 2012 Canadian horror thriller film directed by Braden Croft, starring Alex D. Mackie, Brittney Gabrill, Ryland Alexander, Diane Wallace, Samara von Rad and Zachary Parsons-Lozinski.

Cast
 Alex D. Mackie as Oliver Lorenz
 Brittney Gabrill as Claire
 Ryland Alexander as Ronnie
 Diane Wallace as Dr. Peck
 Samara von Rad as Janet Lorenz
 Zachary Parsons-Lozinski as Todd
 Braden Croft as Ray
 Grace Glowicki as Pharmacist

Release
The film was released on VOD on 1 June 2013.

Reception
John Anderson of Variety wrote a positive review of the film, writing that "Croft, working with limited resources, shows what a filmmaker can accomplish through visual virtuosity." Mark L. Miller of Ain't It Cool News wrote a positive review of the film, calling it "an effective thriller with strong performances from a fresh pair of lead actors and some truly impressive restraint on the part of the director." Ian Sedensky of Culture Crypt gave the film a score of 70 out of 100, writing that the film "proves that a micro-budget and a crew consisting of generous friends does not automatically exclude professional quality and a competitive edge".

References

External links
 
 

2012 films
2012 horror films
2012 thriller films
Canadian horror thriller films
2012 horror thriller films
2010s Canadian films